Prince was well known in the entertainment industry for having a vast body of work that remains unreleased. It has been said that his vault contains multiple unreleased albums and over 50 fully produced music videos that have never been released, along with albums and other media. The following is a list, in rough chronological order, of the most prominent  of these unreleased works. Many were later released and circulated among collectors as bootlegs.

The Rebels
Before Prince formed The Time, he considered using his backing band as a side-project called The Rebels. The 1979 project was a group effort, with songs being written and sung by the various members (only Bobby Z and Dr. Fink did not sing). André Cymone and Dez Dickerson each contributed material and a few numbers were sung by Gayle Chapman. Instead of making something that sounded similar to his R&B solo output, Prince wanted go into more rock elements of songs such like "I'm Yours" and "Bambi". The project was eventually shelved feeling that the whole thing sounded too generic, but two of the songs composed by Prince were re-recorded and released much later: "If I Love U 2 Night" by Mica Paris (and later by Prince's wife-to-be Mayte Garcia) and "You" (renamed "U") by Paula Abdul. The original Prince guide vocal for "If I Love U 2 Nite" appeared by mistake on the rare Mica Paris Stand for Love EP, of which only a handful exist. From 10–21 July 1979, the band recorded nine tracks together at Mountain Ears Sound Studio, Boulder, CO, US:

 "Too Long"
 "Disco Away"
 "Thrill You or Kill You"
 "You"
 "If I Love You Tonight"
 "The Loser"
 "Hard to Get"
 Untitled instrumental by Dez Dickerson
 Untitled instrumental by André Cymone

No further sessions under the name "The Rebels" are known to have taken place.

The Second Coming
The Second Coming was planned to be a documentary film and live album from Prince's Controversy Tour directed by Chuck Statler, that was shot on the 7 March 1982 concert at Bloomington, Minnesota. The tour was professionally filmed, with a storyline between songs, but the project was abandoned, likely due to Prince's schedule producing The Time and Vanity 6. The title comes from a prerecorded a cappella intro to the tour, immediately preceding the song "Uptown".

Setlist of the 7 March 1982 show at the Met Center, Bloomington, MN, US

 Intro: "The Second Coming"
 "Uptown"
 "Why You Wanna Treat Me So Bad?"
 "When You Were Mine"
 "I Wanna Be Your Lover"
 "Head"
 "Annie Christian"
 "Dirty Mind"
 "Do Me, Baby"
 "Controversy"
 "Let's Work"
 "Jack U Off"
 "Private Joy"

Apollonia 6 film

A mini film project as four-track video was filmed, loosely based on the Apollonia 6 album. It was directed by Brian Thomson, an Australian production designer of the original stage versions of The Rocky Horror Show and Jesus Christ Superstar, and scripted by Keith Williams (concept writer for music videos by Phil Collins, Ray Parker Jr., and Donna Summer), with a cast comprising Ricky Nelson (as "Mr. Christian"), Edy Williams and Buck Henry. Shot in a Los Angeles film studio in 1985, and produced by British video firm Limelight, the video never went beyond the rough-cut stage. The songs featured on the film are "Happy Birthday, Mr. Christian", "Sex Shooter", "Blue Limousine" and "Ooo She She Wa Wa".
The plot introduced three lingerie clad widows gathered to listen the reading of Mr. Christian's will and testament which leaves them nothing and encourages them to work. The imagery and set is very 1960's revamped into 1980's colorful graphic trends. The scenes show prominent neon words such as 'FILL' at a gas station for "Blue Limousine", where Brenda Bennett has the main vocal role, 'EAT' at a diner for "Ooo She Wa Wa", where Susan Moonsie leads while the two others find themselves struggling in front of piles of dirty dishes to wash. The part featuring Apollonia in the leading role features the word 'BUY' in a supermarket set.

The Flesh
The Flesh was a project of live jam sessions recorded in late 1985 to early 1986. The project was abandoned when Prince began work on Parade although a small instrumental portion of a track called "Junk Music" made it into the film Under the Cherry Moon. A circulating outtake from these sessions is titled "U Got 2 Shake Something".

The Flesh was a kind of precursor to Madhouse. All the tracks were jazz-funk instrumentals. The songs were recorded in 3 sessions soon after Christmas 1985 at Sunset Sound.

The first session was on December 28, 1985:
Prince, Eric Leeds, Sheila E. and Levi Seacer, Jr. recorded 8 tracks: 
 "Slaughterhouse" 
 "U Just Can't Stop" 
 "Run Amok" 
 "Mobile" 
 "Madrid" 
 "Breathless" 
 "High Calonic" 
 "12 Keys"

Prince was so pleased with the results that they all returned to the studio 2 days later to record another 3 tracks: 
 "U Gotta Shake Something" 
 "Voodoo Who" 
 "Finest Whiskey"

On January 5, 1986, Prince, Eric, Sheila and Levi returned to the studio once more, this time with Wendy & Lisa, and Wendy's brother, Jonathan Melvoin. They recorded another 6 tracks: 
 "Groove In C Minor" 
 "Slow Groove In G Major" 
 "Groove In G Flat Minor" 
 "Junk Music" 
 "Up From Below" 
 "Y'all Want Some More"
 
On January 22, 1986, Prince assembled an album by "The Flesh" entitled Junk Music which consisted of the following tracks:

Side one
"Junk Music"
Side two
"Up From Below"
"Y'all Want Some More"
"A Couple Of Miles"

"Junk Music" was originally about 45 minutes long, but was edited down to 20 minutes for the album (a little of it can be heard in Under The Cherry Moon during the scene where Christopher Tracy races Mary) . "A Couple Of Miles" was an instrumental that Prince recorded on December 26, 1985 (he also recorded "Can I Play With U" in the same session), Eric Leeds added some saxophone to it on December 30. The album was shelved due to the fact that Prince's time was taken up with other projects (Under The Cherry Moon, Parade and The Family). Prince liked the idea of releasing an instrumental jazz-funk album under a pseudonym. He finally got round to it in 1987, but renamed the project Madhouse and ditched the old Flesh tracks in favor of fresh new recordings.

Prince and the Revolution: Dream Factory
Dream Factory was a single, then double LP project recorded with The Revolution from 1986. Revolution albums, the entire band was invited into the studio and contributed to most of the original tracks, so it meant that the songs would either be full band performances, solo recordings by Prince or largely recorded by Prince with certain members contributing, namely Wendy Melvoin and Lisa Coleman. Many of the tracks would later be incorporated into Crystal Ball (see below) or be released through other outlets over the years.

22 April 1986 configuration

Side 1
 "Visions"
 "Dream Factory"
 "It's A Wonderful Day"
 "The Ballad of Dorothy Parker"
 "Big Tall Wall"
 "And That Says What?"

Side 2
 "Strange Relationship" (different version than released)
 "Teacher, Teacher"
 "Starfish and Coffee" (omits the alarm clock intro)
 "A Place In Heaven"
 "Sexual Suicide" (different version than released)

3 June 1986 configuration

Side 1
 "Visions"
 "Dream Factory"
 "It's A Wonderful Day"
 "The Ballad of Dorothy Parker"
 "It"

Side 2
 "Strange Relationship" (different version than released)
 "Teacher, Teacher"
 "Starfish and Coffee" (omits the alarm clock intro)
 "Colors"
 "In A Large Room With No Light"
 "Nevaeh Ni Ecalp A"
 "Sexual Suicide"

Side 3
 "Crystal Ball"
 "Power Fantastic"

Side 4
 "Last Heart"
 "Witness 4 The Prosecution"
 "Movie Star"
 "A Place In Heaven"
 "All My Dreams"

18 July 1986 configuration

Side 1
 "Visions"
 "Dream Factory"/"Nevaeh Ni Ecalp A"
 "Train" (different version than released)
 "The Ballad of Dorothy Parker"
 "It"

Side 2
 "Strange Relationship" (different version than released)
 "Starfish and Coffee" (omits the alarm clock intro)
 "Colors"
 "Slow Love"
 "I Could Never Take the Place of Your Man" (different version than released)

Side 3
 "Sign o' the Times" (version released as edit on the "Sign o' the Times" single)
 "A Place In Heaven" (Lisa Coleman on lead vocals)
 "Crystal Ball"

Side 4
 "The Cross"
 "Last Heart"
 "Witness 4 The Prosecution"
 "Movie Star"
 "All My Dreams"

There is a bootleg CD available of the July 1986 track configuration, which comes with a color pencil sketch made by Susannah Melvoin as cover, which was a concept for the prospective album sleeve. This album cover is attributed to The Flesh rather than Prince and The Revolution.

Camille

Camille is an unreleased album by Prince, recorded in 1986. The album was planned to consist of 8 tracks recorded by the singer in a feminine, sped up vocal. The album was to be released under the name Camille (who would not be pictured on the cover) and not as a Prince album. The album was canceled weeks prior to its release and most of the tracks were incorporated into the unreleased album Crystal Ball, which evolved into Sign o' the Times. Most of the music had been released officially in some form or another, however, one song, "Rebirth of the Flesh" remained unreleased in its original form until 2020 when it was released on the Sign o' the Times Super Deluxe Edition. In 2001, a live rehearsal of "Rebirth of the Flesh" recorded with the Sign o' the Times  band was released on Prince's website. This version, however, had profanity edited from the lyrics.

Side one
 "Rebirth of the Flesh": Prince recorded this song at Sunset Sound on October 28, 1986, on the same day as "Rockhard in a Funky Place". When the Camille album was shelved, the song was slated for inclusion on Prince's next album project, Crystal Ball. It was going to be the opening track segueing into "Play in the Sunshine". The NPG Music Club made a 1988 Lovesexy Tour rehearsal recording available in September 2001, marking the point at which all the Camille tracks have now been officially released in some form, the original studio version was released on the super deluxe boxset of Sign o' the Times in 2020.
 "Housequake": significantly remixed for Sign "☮" the Times.

 "Strange Relationship": Reworked from the Dream Factory sessions and released unedited on Sign "☮" the Times.

 "Feel U Up": This outtake was recorded in November 1981 and was taped in a different session sequence from "Irresistible Bitch". Both songs were re-recorded later. "Feel U Up" was re-recorded on October 26, 1986 and the lyrics of both recordings are very similar. The track was finally released in 1989 as the B-side of "Partyman".

Side two
 "Shockadelica": Originally written (unsolicited) by Prince in response to Jesse Johnson's then-forthcoming album titled Shockadelica (1986) because that album had no song to match/complement what Prince felt was such a great album title. "Shockadelica" was later included as a B-side of "If I Was Your Girlfriend".
 "Good Love": Later released on the Bright Lights, Big City film soundtrack in 1988, then compiled on Crystal Ball.

 "If I Was Your Girlfriend": released with an added intro on Sign "☮" the Times.
 "Rockhard in a Funky Place": Included on The Black Album (1987) project, which was ultimately released in 1994.

Two other songs were credited to Camille after the album project was abandoned. The first was "Scarlet Pussy", which was released as the B-side of the 1988 single "I Wish U Heaven" featuring a black label with the artist Camille credited in deep peach.  The song was also submitted for Sheila E's upcoming 4th album, however the album went unreleased. Also, "U Got the Look", which appeared on Sign "☮" the Times and was also released as a single. The video was recorded in France while Prince was on tour and the video was later added into the film Sign "☮" the Times.

Prince would later resurrect the character of Camille for the 1988 Lovesexy tour. Within the show, Camille sang in a low tone, with Prince's vocal filtered to sound lower. Prince has used this technique on numerous occasions, uncredited to Camille. Prince confirmed in the Lovesexy tour book that Camille is the creator of The Black Album.

Crystal Ball

Crystal Ball was a 3-LP set to be released in 1986, The set was to consist of various tracks from 1985–1986. Although several Dream Factory tracks were incorporated, this set was to be marketed as a solo album by Prince. Warner Bros. Records balked at the album's length so Prince begrudgingly trimmed it to the 2-LP Sign "☮" the Times, which many still consider to be his best album (although Purple Rain was his most successful). The album is notable for two reasons; it was the last studio album to be recorded with The Revolution and the events said to have surrounded its recording led to the resignation of both Wendy & Lisa, effectively dissolving Prince's band until the creation of the New Power Generation.

Final configuration

Side 1
 "Rebirth of the Flesh"
 "Play in the Sunshine"
 "Housequake"
 "The Ballad of Dorothy Parker"

Side 2
 "It"
 "Starfish and Coffee"
 "Slow Love"
 "Hot Thing"

Side 3
 "Crystal Ball"
 "If I Was Your Girlfriend"
 "Rockhard in a Funky Place"

Side 4
 "The Ball" (Eye No in Lovesexy)
 "Joy in Repetition" (moved to Graffiti Bridge)
 "Strange Relationship"
 "I Could Never Take the Place of Your Man"

Side 5
 "Shockadelica"
 "Good Love"
 "Forever In My Life"
 "Sign O' the Times"

Side 6
 "The Cross"
 "It's Gonna Be a Beautiful Night"
 "Adore (Until the End of Time)"

Madhouse: 24
Prince worked on a third Madhouse album recorded during July–December 1988, with a planned release in early 1989, featuring the cover model Maneca Lightner. The album has never materialized. Some of the tracks were altered (in fact, only 21 "The Dopamine Rush") and reused on Eric Leeds's Times Squared album released in 1991. A totally different version of 24 was recorded with members of The New Power Generation and Eric Leeds in 1993, but this also was not released, with the exception of the track "17" of the 1-800-NEW-FUNK compilation album. Some of the tracks were on the rare "The Versace Experience" cassette. Both versions of the album circulate on the internet.

Track listings

1989 album configuration
 "17 (Penetration)"
 "18 (R U Legal Yet?)"
 "19 (Jailbait)"
 "20 (A Girl and Her Puppy)"
 "21–24 (The Dopamine Rush Suite)" (Incorporates "21 (The Dopamine Rush)", "22 (Amsterdam)", "23 (Spanish Eros)" and "24 (Orgasm)")

1994 album configuration

1994 configuration
 "17"
 "Rootie Kazootie"
 "Space"
 "Guitar Segue"
 "Asswoop"
 "Ethereal Segue"
 "Parlor Games"
 "Michael Segue"
 "(Got 2) Give It Up"
 "Sonny Segue"

May, 1995 configuration
 "17"
 "Rootie Kazootie"
 "Space"
 "Guitar Segue"
 "Asswoop"
 "Ethereal Segue"
 "Parlor Games"
 "Michael Segue"
 "Overture #5"
 "Overture #6"
 "18 & Over"
 "(Got 2) Give It Up" (edit)
 "Sonny Segue"

Sheila E.: Untitled 1989 album
An album was recorded by Sheila E., between early 1987 and late 1988, and planned for release in 1989. The album was abandoned when Sheila E. left Paisley Park Records in early 1989, and most of the album's tracks remain unreleased. The only track from the album to have been released is "Scarlet Pussy" (credited to Camille), which was included as the b-side of "I Wish U Heaven". The album included a cover of Donny Hathaway's ".The Ghetto".  Two other tracks were resurrected for later projects, however. In mid-September, 1993, "Latino Barbie Doll" was tried out for Mayte during initial sessions for her solo debut album, and was included on an initial configuration of the album, titled Latino Barbie Doll, before being removed from later configurations as the album developed into Child of the Sun. During the A Celebration week in June, 2000, computer screens at Paisley Park Studios offered names of a selection of tracks which users could vote on for inclusion on Crystal Ball Volume II; "3 Nigs Watchin' a Kung Fu Movie" was included on the list and was chosen by fans, the project was ultimately abandoned.

Track listing

Side one
 "3 Nigs Watchin' a Kung Fu Movie"
 "It's a Hard Life" (includes no Prince input)
 "Chicken Legs" (includes no Prince input)
 "Knucklehead"
 "Latino Barbie Doll"

Side two
 "Soul Company"
 "Day After Day" (includes no Prince input)
 "Girl Power"
 "The Ghetto"
 "Scarlet Pussy"

The Time: Corporate World
An unreleased studio album by The Time, recorded in Summer 1989 and planned for release in November, 1989. Like previous albums by The Time, all tracks featured Prince heavily as unique writer and musician, with Morris Day adding vocals as the only member of the band to appear on the album. The album was submitted to Warner Bros., and planned for release on 14 November 1989, with "Nine Lives" planned as the first single. Warner Bros. stopped the release, however, feeling that other members of the band should be brought in to contribute to the album. Following a meeting with Prince, the band members Jesse Johnson, Monte Moir, Terry Lewis and Jimmy Jam began contributing songs to the album without input by Prince, as well as revising "Chocolate" and "Jerk Out" (composed by Prince); the resulting album became The Time's fourth album Pandemonium. Of the tracks included on Corporate World, three tracks were kept for Pandemonium: "Donald Trump (Black Version)", "Data Bank" and "My Summertime Thang". Four other tracks were kept as The Time's contribution to Prince's twelfth album Graffiti Bridge: "Love Machine", "Shake!", "The Latest Fashion" and "Release It". "Murph Drag" was included on NPG Ahdio Show #3 in 2001, but was not available as a separate track. Only "Nine Lives" and "Corporate World" have not been released in any form.

Track listing
 "Murph Drag"
 "Nine Lives"
 "Donald Trump (Black Version)"
 "Love Machine"
 "Data Bank"
 "Shake!"
 "Corporate World"
 "The Latest Fashion"
 "Release It"
 "My Summertime Thang"
 "Rollerskate"

Rave unto the Joy Fantastic

The original Rave unto the Joy Fantastic album was shelved when Prince started working on the Batman soundtrack in late 1988. The album shared some tracks with Graffiti Bridge and was to be a house music album; the title track was finally released in 1999 slightly remixed on a new album of the same name.

Track listings

27 October 1988 configuration
The specific sequence of tracks are unknown, but tracks known to have been included are:
 "The Voice Inside"
 "Melody Cool" (an updated version with Mavis Staples lead vocals was released on Graffiti Bridge)
 "Rave unto the Joy Fantastic" (an edited and reworked version released on Rave Un2 the Joy Fantastic)
 "God is Alive"
 "If I Had a Harem"
 "Stimulation"
 "Still Would Stand All Time" (a version with background vocals overdubs by The Steeles over Prince's original background vocals was released on Graffiti Bridge)
 "Elephants & Flowers" (an other version with different verses was released on Graffiti Bridge)
 "Big House"
 "We Got the Power" (sampled in Batdance Bat Mix)
No details are known about the sequence, other than that "The Voice Inside" is known to have segued into "Melody Cool".

27 November 1988 configuration
 "Rave unto the Joy Fantastic"
 "If I Had a Harem"
 "The Voice Inside"
 "Melody Cool"
 "Stimulation"
 "Elephants & Flowers"
 "God is Alive"
 "Still Would Stand All Time"

Mid-January 1989 configuration
 "Rave unto the Joy Fantastic"
 "If I Had a Harem"
 "Good Judy Girlfriend" (a re-recording by Carmen Electra was released on her only album Carmen Electra)
 "Pink Cashmere" (released on The Hits/The B-Sides)
 "Electric Chair" (released on Batman)
 "Am I Without U?"
 "God is Alive"
 "Still Would Stand All Time" (released on Graffiti Bridge)
 "Moonbeam Levels" (released on Prince 4Ever)

Flash
In 1989, Prince formed a new band called Flash / MC Flash (both names were considered for use), featuring Margie Cox (of Ta Mara and the Seen) as lead singer. In July, Cox recorded 25 songs written by Prince for a planned album. No M.C. Flash album or singles were ever released. The only songs to be released as a result of Prince and Cox's work together was her cover of Prince's "Standing at the Altar" for his 1994 compilation album 1-800-NEW-FUNK, and the B-side of that single, "Whistlin' Kenny".

Track listing

Side one
 "R U There?"
 "Brand New Boy"
 "Warden in the Prison of Love"
 "Bed of Roses"
 "Good Man"
 "Whistlin' Kenny"

Side two
 "We Can Hang"
 "Curious Blue"
 "Girls Will Be Girls"
 "Good Body Every Evening"

The Tora Tora Experience
At the height of his troubles with Warner Bros. Records in 1994, Prince contributed under the moniker Tora Tora on the NPG's Exodus album. Happy with this pseudonym, a full album was recorded, but it remains unreleased. Very little is known about this project, but it was mentioned on the 1995 "Sampler Experience" cassette by the tracks "(Lemme See Your Body) Get Loose!" a remix of "Loose!" from Prince's 1994 Come album.

The Undertaker
This recording was made in a continuous single live-in-the-studio pass in collaboration with NPG drummer Michael Bland and bassist Sonny T. Prince originally intended to give this live CD away free with 1,000 copies of Guitar Player magazine in 1994 (uploading an original The Undertaker CD to iTunes, shows the year 1995 as the year the CD was "released"), but he was reportedly barred by Warner Bros. from doing so. Copies were leaked and bootlegged. The songs were guitar-heavy versions of rock and blues numbers, including a cover of The Rolling Stones' "Honky Tonk Women" and new recording of "Bambi" (originally from 1979's Prince). The title track was a cover of a song previously given to Mavis Staples, while "The Ride", "Zannalee", and "Dolphin" would all be re-recorded future releases. A video recording of the performance was released in Europe (on VHS and Laserdisc) with small edits throughout the performance and "Dolphin" replaced by the audio track from the official video of the song from The Gold Experience.

Track listing
 "The Ride" – 10:54
 "Poor Goo" – 4:26
 "Honky Tonk Women" – 3:00
 "Bambi" – 4:49
 "Zannalee (prelude)" – 0:44
 "The Undertaker" – 9:50
 "Dolphin" – 3:40

Heart

Was worked on in 1994. Nothing is known about the album, although it is believed to contain acoustic tracks (it is not known if there is any overlap between this project and The Truth, recorded two years later and released in 1998).

"Live"

"Live" is an unreleased multiple-disc album, offered to Warner Bros. in January 1995. Little is known about the contents, other than it contained live tracks recorded on tours between 1987 and 1993: the Sign o' the Times Tour, the Lovesexy Tour, the Nude Tour, the Diamonds and Pearls Tour, and the Act I and Act II tours. It was supposed to contain four discs, but it is unknown if the material was arranged chronologically or in another way. 
The album is unrelated to the "Live" single planned for release the previous year, and The Live Experience album planned for release later in 1995, both of which were planned to be credited to and contained live tracks recorded in 1994 and 1995 consecutively.

Possibly List of songs

 Sign o' the Times (1987)
 Controversy (1990)
 Partyman/Loose! (1993)
 Dead On It (1992)
 Superfunkycaligsexy (1988)
 Goldnigga (1993)
 Now's the Time (Instrumental) (1987)
 Nothing Compares 2 U (1990)
 Johnny (1993)
 Housequake (1990)
 If I Had A Harem (1988)
 Scandalous! (1988)
 Sexy MF (1992)
 Bob George (1988)
 Damn U (1992)
 Thieves In the Temple (1992)
 The Light Is Coming (1988)
 A Night In Tunisia/Strollin' (1992)
 Little Red Corvette (1987)
 Nothing Campers 2 U (1992)
 Adore (1987)
 The Continental (1993)
 She's Always in My Hair (1993)
 Ain't No Way (1990)
 Dr. Feelgood (1992)
 Partyman (1990)
 Purple Rain (1990)
 Purple Rain (1993)

The Live Experience

Unreleased live album, worked on in 1995. Little is known about the contents, other than it contained live tracks recorded at the 8 June 1995 show at Glam Slam, Miami Beach, FL, US (celebrating Prince's 37th birthday; his second as O(+>). Specific tracks are not known, and it is not known how many discs were planned, or whether the contents were arranged chronologically or sequenced another way.
The album is unrelated to the "Live" single planned for release the previous year (which contained tracks recorded in 1994), and the "Live" album planned for release earlier in 1995 (which was planned to be credited to Prince and contained live tracks recorded between 1987 and 1993).

Setlist of the 8 June 1995 show at Glam Slam, Miami Beach, FL, US

 "Endorphinmachine"
 "The Jam"
 "Shhh"
 "Days of Wild"
 "Now"
 "Funky Stuff"
 "The Most Beautiful Girl in the World"
 "P. Control"
 "Letitgo"
 "Pink Cashmere"
 "(Lemme See Your Body) Get Loose!" (unreleased remix of "Loose!")
 "Count the Days"
 "Return of the Bump Squad"
 Arabic intro
 "7"
 "Get Wild"
 "Johnny"
 "Billy Jack Bitch"
 "Gold"

New World

New World is thought to be an unreleased album worked on in 1995. It was mentioned by Mayte in an interview with Uptown magazine in July, 1995, and it is possible that she was mistaken in naming the album, and it was in fact Emancipation (or that Emancipation was briefly known as New World, even though the name Emancipation had already been used).
Very little is known about the album, although Mayte described it as a "techno" album, and is believed to have included both "New World", which was later released on Emancipation, "The Same December", which was later released on Chaos and Disorder, and "Goodbye", which was later released on "Crystal Ball".

Tracklist:

 "Synasthesia"
 "New World"
 "Candle Burns"
 "Empty Room"
 "Feel Good"
 "I'm a DJ"
 "2020"
 "Funky Design"
 "The Same December"
 "Goodbye"

The Vault – Volumes I, II and III

"The Vault – Volumes I, II and III" is a series of three albums announced on 22 December 1995 during a press release announcing that Prince had given notice to Warner Bros. of his desire to terminate his contract.
The albums, to be credited to Prince, were to serve as the fulfillment of his contract, which  intended to follow by releasing Emancipation. They are believed to be three separate single-disc albums, but as they were only mentioned once on a press release, with no distinction between the three volumes, they are listed here together.
As both Chaos and Disorder and The Vault... Old Friends 4 Sale were submitted to Warner Bros. in April 1996, the common assumption has been that these albums made up two of the volumes of The Vault – Volumes I, II and III.
Seven tracks included on the two releases ("Dinner with Delores", "I Rock, Therefore I Am", "Into the Light", "I Will", "Dig U Better Dead", "Had U" and "Sarah") were recorded between February and April 1996, however, after the press release announcing The Vault – Volumes I, II, and III, indicating that some changes took place before the formation of Chaos and Disorder and The Vault...Old Friends 4 Sale.
Tracks believed to have been included on The Vault – Volumes I, II, and III include the following:

 "Chaos and Disorder"
 "I Like It There"
 "The Same December"
 "Right the Wrong"
 "Zannalee"
 "The Rest of My Life"
 "It's About That Walk"
 "She Spoke 2 Me"
 "5 Women"
 "When the Lights Go Down"
 "My Little Pill"
 "There Is Lonely"
 "Old Friends 4 Sale"
 "Extraordinary"

It is likely that several more tracks were included, but no details are known. It is possible, however, that the project was announced in the press release without any corresponding albums completed (indicated by the generic title "The Vault – Volumes I, II and III"), and that the project was never completed before work on Chaos and Disorder and The Vault...Old Friends 4 Sale took over.

Prince and Mayte: Happy Tears
With the pregnancy of Prince's then-wife Mayte Garcia, Prince was inspired to make and announce a children's music album called Happy Tears, credited to Prince and Mayte. The album was supposed to have been released November 1996. The album was going to include a book of children's stories with it, also credited to Prince and Mayte. To promote the album, Prince guest-starred on the show Muppets Tonight and performed the only song confirmed that would have been included on the album, "She Gave Her Angels", which remained unreleased until inclusion on the Crystal Ball set. The album was likely canceled because of Prince's son's death one week after birth.

The Dawn
The Dawn was to be the first Prince album after Emancipation, but it was shelved in 1997.  The album was at that point slated to be the accompanying soundtrack to a film of the same name, but because of the box office failure of Graffiti Bridge, this wasn't possible. An acoustic version of the title track can be found on The Truth. Prince had often thought of releasing an album called The Dawn at many points during his career. The earliest known incarnation of 'The Dawn' was from 1986, and seems to have been some kind of musical (an idea that eventually resurfaced as 'Graffiti Bridge'). Another incarnation of 'The Dawn' was assembled around 1994, soon after Prince changed his stage name to an unpronounceable symbol. This time the content was made from tracks that would later surface on Come and The Gold Experience. The last known incarnation of the album was assembled in 1996/1997, this time it came very close to release, and was even advertised on the back of the free cassette single of "The Holy River" that was given away at Borders stores in 1997.

Tracks believed to have been included on the 1994 album

Triple album. Combined tracks which had been previously included on 1993 configurations of Come, along with tracks that would later be released on The Gold Experience and Chaos and Disorder, along with various NPG Operator segues, although the exact track listing is not known.

 "Come"
 "Endorphinmachine"
 "Space"
 "Pheromone"
 "Loose!"
 "Papa"
 "Dark"
 "Dolphin"
 "Poem" (later edited and renamed "Orgasm")
 "Race"
 "Strays of the World"
 "What's My Name"
 "Interactive"
 "Solo"
 "Zannalee"
 "The Most Beautiful Girl in the World"
 "Now"
 "Ripopgodazippa"
 "Shy"
 "Gold"
 "319"
 "Billy Jack Bitch"
 "Chaos and Disorder"
 "Right the Wrong"
 "Acknowledge Me"
 "Listen 2 the Rhythm" (later renamed "The Rhythm of Your ♥")
 "Hide the Bone"
 "Love 4 1 Another" (later renamed "New World")
 "Days of Wild"

Other tracks not included on any configuration of Come, The Gold Experience or Chaos and Disorder that may have been considered for inclusion here include the following:

 "Strawberries"
 "Dream"
 "Laurianne"
 "Dance of Desperation"
 "I Wanna Be Held 2 Night"
 "Emotional Crucifixion"
 "The Ride"
 "Poorgoo"
 "Calhoun Square" (later released on ‘’Crystal Ball’’)
 "It's About That Walk" (later released on The Vault: Old Friends 4 Sale)
 "Slave 2 the Funk"

All tracks listed here are speculative, however.

Tracks believed to have been included on the 1996/1997 album

 "Welcome 2 the Dawn" (an acoustic version was later released on The Truth)
 "The Most Beautiful Girl in the World (Mustang Mix '96)"

Mayte: Scorpio
Announced by Love4OneAnother.com in 1998, it was due to include some tracks from her debut album Child of the Sun, as well as some newly recorded tracks. It is not known if the album was completed before it was abandoned, however, and the project may have been interrupted by Prince and Mayte's marital issues in late 1998 and early 1999. The title of the album comes from Mayte's astrological sign of the Zodiac. Born on 12 November 1973, she is a Scorpio. Nothing is known about which tracks were intended for the album, but the manufacture in 1998 of the single "Rhythm of Your ♥" (later sold in 2005 on Mayte's website) indicates that "The Rhythm of Your ♥" (possibly renamed "Rhythm of Your ♥") was planned for inclusion.

Beautiful Strange

Worked on in mid-to-late 1998. Little is known about the album, although it is thought that the album would have been planned for release around the same time as the Beautiful Strange TV film broadcast in late October, 1998. Unlike the TV special, which was mostly a lengthy interview and live footage, the album is thought to be a full studio recording.

Only two tracks are known to have been planned for inclusion on the album: "Beautiful Strange" and "Twisted", a cover version of a track originally written as an instrumental by Wardell Gray in 1949, before having lyrics added by Scottish jazz singer Annie Ross in 1952 and being released as a single (later included on the album King Pleasure Sings/Annie Ross Sings, the same year).

Prince carried around a lyric book titled Beautiful Strange during the first few weeks of the One Nite Alone... Tour in 2002, and lyrics to "Twisted" were seen inside. The contents of the remainder of the lyric book, and of the album, are unknown, and it is not known how complete the album was before it was abandoned to work on the Prince and the Revolution album Roadhouse Garden, and the album Rave Un2 The Joy Fantastic.

While Prince's version of Twisted remains unreleased, "Beautiful Strange" was broadcast as a lyric video during the Beautiful Strange TV film broadcast (released the following year on the Beautiful Strange home video), and a reworked version was released in 2001 on the Rave In2 The Joy Fantastic remix album (marking the only track to be included on the album that had not been included on Rave Un2 The Joy Fantastic).

Prince and the Revolution: Roadhouse Garden
In 1998, Prince announced a comeback album of Prince & the Revolution that consisted of unreleased songs. It was most likely never released because of a dispute with the original Revolution members. One of the mentioned songs, "Splash" was released on Prince's website. According to former Revolution keyboardist Dr. Fink, Prince asked for Wendy and Lisa's input on the album, but he didn't offer any compensation, so they declined his offer. Later, when people asked about the Roadhouse Garden album, his reply was "Ask Wendy and Lisa".

The specific sequence of tracks is unknown, but tracks believed to have been included are as follows:

 "Roadhouse Garden"
 "Witness 4 The Prosecution"
 "Splash"
 "All My Dreams"
 "In A Large Room With No Light"
 "Empty Room"
 "Wonderful Ass"

New Funk Sampling Series

Unreleased 7-CD set containing over 700 brief samples of hooks, beats and sounds from tracks recorded by Prince, planned for musicians and DJs to sample.
The set was planned for sale for a one-time fee of $700, with no additional royalties necessary for use of the tracks.
Website Love4OneAnother.com announced on 28 March 1999, that  had commissioned the set, but nothing else was known until an advertisement and some details were posted on NPGOnlineLtd.com in late May, 2000. Prince then played a short video promoting the set at a party at Paisley Park Studios, Chanhassen, MN, US, on 16 September 2000 (am).
The set was split over seven volumes, subtitled "Bass", "The Human Voice", "Guitar", "Keyboards", "Loops & Percussion", "Sound FX" and "Orchestral". A promotional advertisement for the set mentioned that samples were included from "Kiss", "Raspberry Beret", "When Doves Cry", "Erotic City" and "Days of Wild". Little else is known about the set.

Crystal Ball Volume II
This was a follow up to the 1998 outtake album Crystal Ball. Fans who attended Prince's Paisley Park Studios during June 2000 were given the opportunity to vote for their favorite outtakes out of a list of 23 and 17 were selected. For unknown reasons it was never produced.

The tracks included the following:
 "3 Nigs Watchin' a Kung Fu Movie"
 "Adonis & Bathsheba"
 "American Jam"
 "Come Electra Tuesday" (not selected)
 "Electric Intercourse"
 "Everybody Wants What They Don't Got"
 "Evolsidog"
 "Eye Wonder"
 "Girl" (not selected)
 "Girl o' My Dreams"
 "Gotta Stop (Messin' About)" (not selected)
 "If It'll Make U Happy" (not selected)
 "Katrina's Paper Dolls"
 "Kiss" (Unreleased Xtended Version)
 "Love & Sex"
 "Lust U Always"
 "Others Here with Us"
 "She's Just a Baby" (not selected)
 "Strange Way of Saying Eye Love U"
 "Turn It Up"
 "U're All Eye Want"
 "Xtra Lovable"
 On top of the selected tracks, "What Should B Souled" and "Wonderful Ass" were also thought to be included for the album.

DVD
Another little-known project that was due to be released at the same time as Crystal Ball II was an accompanying Crystal Ball DVD. This was to contain music videos made for tracks off both volumes of the Crystal Ball albums.

A Celebration

A Celebration is an unreleased album by Prince, announced on NPG Ahdio Show # 4 (released 15 May 2001). The announcement stated that Prince was in negotiations with a major record store chain to distribute the album, said to contain 20 "remastered re-recordings" of Prince's greatest hits, along with "at least four brand new songs". This album was not released, however (likely due to the Warner Bros. release of The Very Best of Prince in July, 2001).
It is not known which songs would have been included on the album, and how much the track list overlapped with the setlists used on the brief A Celebration tour, which was likely initially intended to promote the album, but was cancelled after only six concerts (partly to avoid the appearance of supporting The Very Best of Prince, and partly because of Prince wanting to spend time with his father, whose health was ailing at that point).
It is possible that one of the new tracks was "U Make My Sun Shine", which had already been released as a single, but this is purely speculative. It is possible that one of the "remastered re-recordings" included on the album would have been "1999: The New Master", which had been released as a single in 1999, but during the years following the end of the year 1999 Prince viewed the song as "retired" (not playing it live), making its inclusion unlikely.

When 2 R in Love: The Ballads of Prince
Announced for voting as the next Prince release during the A Celebration week in June 2000. Ballads collection. Full track list and sequencing is unknown, but it is known to include

 "Do Me, Baby"
 "Insatiable"
 "Scandalous!"
 "Adore"
 "When 2 R in Love"

The Hot X-perience
In 2000, a vinyl maxi single was announced. It would contain new club remixes of "Hot wit U" featuring Eve.

On July 19, 2000, DJ Wolf played some unreleased mixes, likely from The Hot X-perience, at a club known as The Front in Minneapolis, Minnesota:

 "Hot wit U" (Nasty Girl remix)
 "Hot wit U" (hip-hop version)
 "Underneath the Cream"
 "So Far, So Pleased" (club/dance mix; includes portions of "Rave un2 the Joy Fantastic")
 "Hot wit U" (club/dance mix)

"Underneath the Cream" was later released on Prince's website and an edit of the Nasty Girl Remix was released on the remix album Rave In2 the Joy Fantastic.

High
In 2000, High was fully complete and ready to release in the summer of 2000, but the album was never released. A video was recorded for the song "U Make My Sun Shine", a duet with Angie Stone, and it was also released as a single. A video was also made for "Daisy Chain," featuring Prince playing basketball in his own court at Paisley Park, and "When Eye Lay My Hands on U". Most songs were distributed individually via his NPG Music Club. "Silicon," "Daisy Chain" and "Golden Parachute" were also included on the internet-only The Slaughterhouse project. Prince released The Rainbow Children instead.

Track listing
 "Supercute"
 "Underneath the Cream"
 "Golden Parachute"
 "When Will We B Paid?"
 "The Daisy Chain"
 "Gamillah"
 "High"
 "My Medallion"
 "U Make My Sun Shine"
 "When Eye Lay My Hands on U"

NPG: Peace
During the "Hit and Run Tour" in 2001, an NPG single from what was billed as the forthcoming new NPG album, 'Peace' was sold. It featured the title track, "Peace" coupled with "2045: Radical Man". The album remains unreleased, while "2045: Radical Man" was given to Spike Lee for his Bamboozled soundtrack. Instead, "Peace" and "2045: Radical Man" were later released on the internet-only release of The Slaughterhouse. A full track list is not known, if it was ever completed. The album was believed to include:

 "Peace"
 "2045: Radical Man"

Possibly:
 "The Daisy Chain"
 "Gamillah"
 "Northside"

Untitled Kevin Smith-directed documentary
In the summer of 2001, writer/director Kevin Smith contacted Prince to gain permission to use "The Most Beautiful Girl in the World" for a scene in his movie Jay and Silent Bob Strike Back. Although he was denied permission, he agreed to film a documentary of reactions, questions and answers during one of Prince's fan weeks at his recording studios, Paisley Park. Most of the footage comes from five sessions of Prince and Smith discussing music with fans. The footage still resides in Prince's vault, while some was used to promote The Rainbow Children album and as background video at some of his live concerts.

Smith described the experience in his 2002 live video An Evening with Kevin Smith; according to An Evening with Kevin Smith 2: Evening Harder, Prince was intending to edit the film into a promotional movie for Jehovah's Witnesses.

Madrid 2 Chicago
A new album was announced for 2001. Two songs entitled "Madrid 2 Chicago" and "Breathe" were distributed via the NPG Music Club, but the full album remains unreleased.

In All My Dreams
During mid-2001/2002 artwork was posted on NPG Music Club for an album called "In All My Dreams". Because of the title, it was assumed that it included the Dream Factory outtake "All My Dreams". Nothing else is known, and the album has never materialized

Last December
Announced in the "One Nite Alone..." tour book in March 2002, the title is a track from The Rainbow Children. The album has never materialized.

The Very Best of O(+>
Announced in the "One Nite Alone..." tour book in March 2002. Nothing else is known about the album, although from the title it seems likely that the album was a compilation of tracks recorded while Prince used the symbol "Love Symbol" as his name (from 1993 to 2000), although, given licensing, it seems likely this would be restricted to master tracks owned by Prince, rather than by Warner Bros. (eliminating tracks used on The Gold Experience and Chaos and Disorder). Alternatively, it may have included some re-recordings of tracks which had been originally released by Warner Bros., but all information about the album is speculative. The title may have been in response to Warner Bros.' release of The Very Best of Prince, released in late July, 2001, seven months before this album was announced.

The Chocolate Invasion
In 2003 it was announced that the members-only tracks from the first years of the NPG Music Club would be released in a 7-CD boxed set containing:
 C-Note
 Xpectation
 One Nite Alone... – solo piano & voice
 The Chocolate Invasion – Trax from NPGMC Volume 1
 The Slaughterhouse – Trax from NPGMC Volume 2
 "The Glam Slam" club mix
 "The War"

In November 2003, a problem with manufacturing was reported, and the project was put on hold. The only albums that have become available on CD in limited editions before were "The War", available through 1-800-NEW-FUNK in 1998 and One Nite Alone..., sent to NPG Music Club members in 2002 as part of the annual subscription. Furthermore, all albums have been made available for download (in some cases with tracks varying very slightly) via the NPG Music Club at various stages. An excerpt of "The Glam Slam Club Mix" was possibly part of NPG Ahdio Show #11 and available as a free download in December 2001, C-Note and Xpectation were free downloads for members in January 2003 and became available in the NPG Music Club store in 2004, together with One Nite Alone..., The Chocolate Invasion and The Slaughterhouse.

3121 film
Near the end of 2005, Prince had written and produced for the singer Liza Hernandez (also known as Liza Lena) and, according to the Panamanian news site Prensa.com, "Has maintained a good friendship since they filmed together the film 31-21," and was, according to the site, supposed to be released in April 2006. There are references to the film on a few Prince forums, which, unfortunately for the sake of authenticity, only refer back to quotes from unofficial, unknown, or expired sources. There are no references to the film found on either Prince's official newsletter 3121.com or in the Internet Movie Database. The cover of the 3121 CD reads '3121 – The Music', further fuelling speculation of a 3121 movie. In April 2011, a fully produced trailer for the movie leaked on the net and stated that the movie is "Coming Soon". 3121 movie also has appearances from DJ Rashida and actress Jennifer Gordon.

Aftermath
After the film was shelved, it was reorganized as a new film named LotusFlow3r

Támar: Milk & Honey
In 2005 and early 2006, with a planned release in Spring 2006, during the 3121 sessions, Prince and Támar worked on her debut album. Originally titled Beautiful, Loved & Blessed, it was renamed Milk & Honey. Originally, it was going to be released with Prince's 3121, but it was postponed before being cancelled altogether. However, it got a tiny release in Japan before the cancellation. "Beautiful, Loved & Blessed" was later included in a slightly different form on Prince's 3121, "Holla & Shout" was also available as a promotional single, and the song "Kept Woman" was later re-recorded by Bria Valente for her debut album Elixer.

Track listing
 "Closer 2 My Heart"
 "Milk & Honey"
 "Can't Keep Living Alone"
 "Holla & Shout"
 "Kept Woman"
 "Holy Ground"
 "Beautiful, Loved & Blessed"
 "Redhead Stepchild"
 "All Eye Want Is U"
 "First Love"
 "Sunday in the Park"
 "Beautiful, Loved & Blessed" (reprise)

The L/C
In 2011, Andy Allo posted some songs by Prince and herself on her Facebook account. She has posted a live version of Prince performing "Stratus" and an acoustic version of "Guitar". On that acoustic version of "Guitar", there was meta-data attached to it.  The information saying it is from a project called The L/C featuring Prince and Andy Allo.

In November 2015 Prince streamed an acoustic album, Oui Can Luv, featuring Prince and Andy Allo on Tidal for a very short time. It featured the acoustic version of "Guitar".

Possible track listing:

Guitar (Acoustic Version)
Oui Can Love
Love Is A Losing Game
I Love U In Me

Montreux live concert
Announced in 2013 via a promotional video at the website 20pr1nc3.com, but not materialized. Supposed to be a three-hour concert film, produced through "NPG Films".

Piano & A Microphone 2016 live album
Piano & A Microphone is an unreleased live album by Prince recorded during Prince's final full show of the Piano & a Microphone Tour at the Fox Theatre, Atlanta, GA, US on 14 April 2016.

Prince announced during his last public appearance at Paisley Park Studios on 17 April 2016 (a.m.) that the full show had been mixed for a live release. Specific tracks are not known, and it is not known if a physical release was planned.

The live recording of Black Sweat from this show was made available from Tidal the next day, on 18 April 2016 as the Purple Pick of the Week, and became the final official release of music by Prince before his death on 21 April 2016.

Setlist of the 14 April 2016 show at the Fox Theater, Atlanta, GA, US

 Confluence (pre-recorded intro)
 When Will We B Paid?
 The Max
 Black Sweat
 Girl
 I Would Die 4 U
 Baby I'm a Star
 The Ballad Of Dorothy Parker/Four
 Dark
 Indifference
 Eye Love U, But Eye Don't Trust U Anymore
 Little Red Corvette/Dirty Mind/Linus and Lucy
 Nothing Compares 2 U
 Cream
 Black Muse
 How Come U Don't Call Me Anymore?
 Waiting in Vain/If I Was Your Girlfriend
 Sometimes It Snows in April
 Purple Rain
 The Beautiful Ones
 Diamonds and Pearls
 Purple Rain (coda)

References

External links
 List of Prince bootleg material
 The Emancipation Radio Show

Prince (musician) albums
Prince
Prince
Works by Prince (musician)
Prince